Lenje is a Bantu language of central Zambia. The Lukanga dialect is spoken by the Lukanga Twa Pygmies, fishermen of the Lukanga Swamp. Alternate names for the language are Chilenje, Chinamukuni, Ciina, Ciina Mukuni, Lengi, Lenji, and Mukuni.

References

External links 

Rev. S. Luwisha, Mukulilacoolwe, Lubuto Library Special Collections, accessed May 4, 2014.
Dorothea Lehmann, Folktales from Zambia: Texts in six African languages and in English, Lubuto Library Special Collections, accessed May 3, 2014.
OLAC resources in and about the Lenje language

Languages of Zambia
Botatwe languages
Library of Congress Africa Collection related